George Harold Brooks (1887 – 8 November 1918) was an English professional footballer who played as a half back and centre forward in the Football League for Derby County, Manchester City and Bury.

Personal life 
In January 1917,  years after the outbreak of the First World War, Brooks enlisted in the York and Lancaster Regiment. He was holding the rank of lance corporal when he was wounded in an attack on Neuf-Mesnil on 8 November 1918. Brooks died of wounds at 5th Casualty Clearing Station in Bihécourt, Picardy, France later that day, three days before the armistice. He was buried in Maubeuge (Sous-le-Bois) Cemetery.

Career statistics

Honours 
Derby County
 Football League Second Division: 1914–15

References

1887 births
1918 deaths
People from Radcliffe, Greater Manchester
English footballers
English Football League players
Association football midfielders
Association football forwards
British Army personnel of World War I
York and Lancaster Regiment soldiers
British military personnel killed in World War I
Manchester City F.C. players
Bury F.C. players
South Shields F.C. (1889) players
Derby County F.C. players
Burials in France
Military personnel from Manchester